Duchess Altburg Marie Matilda Olga of Oldenburg (19 May 1903 – 16 June 2001) was a daughter of Frederick Augustus II, Grand Duke of Oldenburg by his second wife Duchess Elisabeth Alexandrine of Mecklenburg-Schwerin.

Early life
In 1914, Altburg and her sister Ingeborg were nearly shot while riding in a motor car. They did not realize a bullet had been fired until they came to a stop and noticed it lodged in the upholstery. Although the person responsible is not known, it is believed that it was a stray bullet fired accidentally.

In 1918, their parents were dethroned as Grand Duke and Grand Duchess of Oldenburg.

Marriage
On 25 August 1922, Altburg married Josias, Hereditary Prince of Waldeck and Pyrmont. He was the eldest son of Friedrich, Prince of Waldeck and Pyrmont and Princess Bathildis of Schaumburg-Lippe. Like her own parents, Josias' parents had lost their titles at the end of World War I. They had five children:

 Princess Margarethe (22 May 1923 – 21 August 2003); her son Eberhard would marry Alexandra Reuss, granddaughter of Princess Marie Adelheid of Lippe
 Princess Alexandra (25 September 1924 – 4 September 2009) 
 Princess Ingrid (2 September 1931 – )
 Wittekind, Prince of Waldeck and Pyrmont (9 March 1936 – ) 
 Princess Guda (22 August 1939 – ), married Friedrich Wilhelm, Prince of Wied, grandson of William Frederick, Prince of Wied.

Ancestry

References

1903 births
2001 deaths
People from Oldenburg (city)
House of Waldeck and Pyrmont
Duchesses of Oldenburg
Princesses of Waldeck and Pyrmont
Daughters of monarchs